Southland High School is a public high school with students in grades nine through twelve.  The school is located in Adams, Minnesota, United States, and is part of the Southland Public Schools school district (ISD #500). The school's athletics mascot is the "Rebel".

References

External links
  Southland Public Schools

Public high schools in Minnesota
Schools in Mower County, Minnesota